Chartiers (sometimes called Chartiers City) is a neighborhood in Pittsburgh, Pennsylvania's West End.  It has a zip code of 15204, and has representation on Pittsburgh City Council by the council member for District 2 (West Neighborhoods). The neighborhood was named after Peter Chartier, a trapper of French and Native American parentage who established a trading post at the mouth of Chartiers Creek in 1743.

Surrounding Pittsburgh Neighborhoods
Chartiers City borders Esplen to the north, Sheraden to the east and southeast, and Windgap from the south, west and northwest.

Further reading

See also
 List of Pittsburgh neighborhoods

References

External links
Interactive Pittsburgh Neighborhoods Map

Neighborhoods in Pittsburgh